is a Japanese diver. She competed in two events at the 1976 Summer Olympics.

References

1958 births
Living people
Japanese female divers
Olympic divers of Japan
Divers at the 1976 Summer Olympics
Place of birth missing (living people)
Asian Games medalists in diving
Divers at the 1974 Asian Games
Asian Games silver medalists for Japan
Medalists at the 1974 Asian Games
20th-century Japanese women